Mahatma Gandhi (1869–1948) is widely regarded as the main icon of the Indian independence movement.

Gandhi or Ghandhi may also refer to:
Gandhi (surname), a surname, and list of people with the name

Arts
Gandhi Before India, a Gandhi biography written by historian Ramachandra Guha.
Gandhi: The Years That Changed the World, a Gandhi biography written by historian Ramachandra Guha.
Gandhi (film), a 1982 film
Gandhi, My Father, a 2007 film about the relationship between Gandhi and his son
Gandhi (American band)
Gandhi (Costa Rican band)
"Gandhi", a song by Anne McCue
"Gandhi", a song from the Patti Smith album Trampin'

People 

 Indira Gandhi, Former Prime Minister of India
 Rajiv Gandhi, Former Prime Minister of India
 Rahul Gandhi, President of the Indian National Congress
 Sonia Gandhi, President of the Indian National Congress

Other
Gandhi (bookstore), a Mexican bookstore chain
MV Hannington Court (1954) or Gandhi, a cargo ship
Nickname of Rehavam Ze'evi (1926-2001), Israeli general and politician
Gandhi (Mexico City Metrobús), a BRT station in Mexico City

See also
Gandi, a French domain name registrar and web host
Gandy (disambiguation)
Gondi (disambiguation)